Hieromartyr Phocas was born in the city of Sinope in northern Turkey. During his adult years he became Bishop of Sinope. At the time of persecution against Christians under the emperor Trajan (98–117), the governor demanded that the saint renounce Christ. After fierce torture they enclosed St Phocas in a hot bath, where he died a martyr's death in the year 117.

A homily in his honour was composed by Saint John Chrysostom on the occasion of the translation of his relics to Constantinople. The translation of his holy relics from Pontus to Constantinople about the year 404 A.D. is celebrated on July 23. His primary feast is on September 22, and he is called a wonderworker.

The Hieromartyr Phocas is especially venerated as a defender against fires, and also as a helper of the drowning.

References

People from Sinop, Turkey
117 deaths
Saints from Roman Anatolia
2nd-century Christian martyrs
2nd-century bishops in Roman Anatolia
Year of birth unknown
Miracle workers